Mount Wells may refer to:

 Mount Wells (Antarctica)
 Mount Wells, Western Australia